Sar Tang-e Soleyman Koshteh (also Romanized as Sar Tang-e Soleymān Koshteh) is a village in Qaleh Tall Rural District, in the Central District of Bagh-e Malek County, Khuzestan Province, Iran. At the 2006 census, its population was 18, in 10 families.

References 

Populated places in Bagh-e Malek County